Franklin Johnson Pearce  (1860–1926) was an American Major League Baseball player who appeared as a relief pitcher in one game for the 1876 Louisville Grays of the National League.  He was 16 years, 188 days old on the day of his lone major league appearance, making him one of the half-dozen youngest players in major league history—and he remains the youngest ever to be making his final ML appearance.

External links

1860 births
1926 deaths
19th-century baseball players
Louisville Grays players
Major League Baseball pitchers
Baseball players from Kentucky